Kristen Elise Lawrence, (born March 2, 1976), is an American organist, composer, and vocalist who writes, produces, records, and performs her music based on Halloween history.  She coined the term "Halloween Carols" to describe her music compositions that celebrate the autumnal season.

Biography

Early years 
Kristen Elise Lawrence was born in Orange County, California and fondly calls Disneyland's Haunted Mansion her second home. After studying piano for five years, she began her organ studies at age 12 with the composer and organist Robert Cummings.  During her high school years she played at church services, arranged music for choral ensembles, and was the featured guest organist at a community Handel's Messiah Sing-along.  In 1993 she won a Philharmonic Society of Orange County music competition.

She accepted a music scholarship to Brigham Young University, studying organ under Dr. Parley Belnap and Dr. Douglas Bush, where her experiences ranged from accompanying on the organ in front of audiences of 20,000 at televised live devotional broadcasts, to singing in the Early Music Ensemble, to performing as a can-can dancer in the university's production of Franz Lehár's The Merry Widow. She graduated from BYU in 2001 with a Bachelor of Music in organ performance and pedagogy, and taught music in Salt Lake City, Utah and Orange County, California.

Performances 
As well as teaching music, playing organ for weddings, funerals/memorial services and church services after college, she arranged and played keyboard in the pop rock band, Checkpoint Charley, recording one album with them and winning the B. B. King’s Battle of the Bands in Hollywood in 2005.

Lawrence was introduced as a "Halloween Specialist" when she played guest keyboards with all-female Iron Maiden tribute metal band, The Iron Maidens, in their October 2010 "Heavy Metal Halloween Show" where she met Iron Maiden keyboardist Michael Kenney and "Eddie" artist Derek Riggs. This was a happy coincidence; Lawrence and Riggs had each been featured in the same Rue Morgue magazine Halloween issue that fall.

In October 2008, Lawrence began performing with Pacific Symphony for the family and school concerts when she was cast as the spooky music teacher/organist in their Halloween Spooktacular, playing on the $3 million C. B. Fisk-built William J. Gillespie Concert Organ in the Renée and Henry Segerstrom Concert Hall in the Orange County Performing Arts Center. Lawrence again performed with Pacific Symphony for their 2011 Halloween family program, opening the show with Bach's Toccata and Fugue in D minor, BWV 565 as well as demonstrating to the audience how the massive pipe organ is played. Besides performing, Kristen's composition skills were utilized when she was asked to score John Williams' Jurassic Park for organ to play with the orchestra. In addition to her performing with Pacific Symphony, she also performs with the Pacific Symphony Youth Orchestra and their ensembles when an organist is needed.

A unique kind of music

Music genre 
Lawrence's music and lyrics have been called unique and eclectic, colored by the diversified influences of Bach, Tori Amos, Loreena McKennitt, Danny Elfman, Ralph Vaughan Williams, and Nightwish. Lawrence incorporates these classical, rock, and folk genres and arranges them into her elegant quirky songs for Halloween and the autumnal season.

Lawrence's original vampire-themed music, with her luxurious "Blood Waltz" and the lush "Vampire Empire", showcases her clear soprano voice. Her use of harpsichord and organ, as well as her somewhat dark subject matter—as in "Sleeping Dust" (a death lullaby) —have afforded her a nod by many as an "honorary goth". And yet, her "Cats in the Catacombs" is pure whimsy in featuring her cat's hisses and yowls as the clever lyrics use words beginning with "cat."

Rue Morgue magazine Music Editor, Trevor Tuminski described Lawrence's music this way: "Lawrence spins ethereal tales with a balance of macabre elements and kid-friendly whimsy ... that give her creations an instantly classic, fun-for-all-ages feel."

Halloween carols 
The interest in Halloween and songwriting came together one day when she was playing the organ at a funeral, and the tune to the traditional round, "Ghost of John," wove through her head. This provided the inspiration that began her musical journey; she wrote the first four songs based on Halloween traditions that day when she returned home.

Lawrence first composes each Halloween Carol as a round, where it harmonizes itself (with the exception of "Dark Glass").  She then composes the melody into four-part harmony where the chords of the carol differ from the repeating chords of the round to give interest and variety. She then writes the lyrics and orchestrates the music.

By 2009, Lawrence had written over 60 Halloween Carols about trick-or-treating, witches, haunted houses, cats, bats, vampires, ghosts, and pumpkins. She released them over time in her albums.

Stephen Fortner, Executive Editor of Keyboard Magazine (October 2010) foretold a spooky coincidence by stating that Kristen's "... Halloween carols produce "an elegance Jack Skellington never quite managed. If the Halloween Town of Tim Burton's The Nightmare Before Christmas had a resident keyboardist, it would be Kristen Lawrence." Who would have guessed that the planets would align so that Steve Bartek, the orchestrator for Nightmare and other Tim Burton film music, would be playing guitar with Kristen's latest music projects!

Halloween research 
The desire to begin researching the history of Halloween germinated during a college semester abroad in Austria in 1999 as she tramped through the leaves in the Vienna Woods and noticed people celebrating All Saints' Day (also called All Hallows) and All Souls' Day. Halloween had always been a time of fun, but its history now intrigued her.

Lawrence continued her research on cultures and traditions of Halloween when she returned to BYU, gathering a large collection of books and articles to study further after she graduated. Favorite researchers include professor of folklore Jack Santino and Halloween expert Lesley Bannatyne Lawrence was asked by Bannatyne to make comments about Halloween music to be included in her book, Halloween Nation: Behind the Scenes of America’s Fright Night.

In addition to her original compositions, Lawrence researches traditional folk songs and arranges them for organ. The songs are largely based on the older roots of Halloween traditions, from pagan ceremonies to the Christian traditions that eventually melded with them.

Music producer

Arachnitect 
The title song of her first album, Arachnitect, is her quirky rock arrangement that touches on the children's classic theme of "Spider and the Fly," complete with a harpsichord and guitar-driven "silent-film-esque" chase scene across a web. She scored two versions of the American folk tune, "Ghost of John," one orchestrated with influences from Bach and Ralph Vaughan Williams, and the other "Bare Bones"  version for voice and organ.  She added several verses of new lyrics for poor John, describing his deteriorating body.

A Broom with a View 
In researching for her second CD, A Broom with a View, Lawrence found two tunes associated with soul cakes.  She combined and arranged her "Souling Songs" with additional original melodies into two versions with very different perspectives of the cultural forces behind Halloween—paganism and Christianity.  As she played around with the traditional Cheshire tune, she was hit with an epiphany that the beginning notes are the same as the medieval plainchant Dies Irae, "Day of Judgment," calling the people to repent and pray for the dead.  It struck her as plausible that the Cheshire tune could be a folk corruption of the chant as children and beggars asked for cakes in return for praying for the dead.   She then wrote the Samhain version from the prospective of the dead coming to visit and enjoying some soul cakes.

Vampire Empire 
Lawrence edited songs from her first two albums, Arachnitect and A Broom with a View, to create an album with songs to meet the time constraints to play on the radio.  She also added the instrumental version of "Dark Glass" to the playlist.

The Raven 
In the 2012 CD album with title song, Edgar Allan Poe’s "The Raven,"  Lawrence sings all 18 verses of Poe's famous poem as if she were the ghost of Lenore.  The musical setting with organ and strings reflects Lawrence's serious study and analysis of Poe's essays, The Philosophy of Composition and The Poetic Principle.

Lawrence's "The Raven" music was used throughout a month-long program sponsored by the National Endowment for the Arts THE BIG READ: Shades of Poe in San Diego and Burbank, California. The events and performances are designed to encourage and inspire the community through stories, music, authors, art, poetry, film, actors and dance to read the works of Edgar Allan Poe.

Hallowe'en: Night of Spirits 
"Night of Spirits" is one of the old names for Halloween, and the traditions from both Pagan Celtic as well as medieval Christian influences are presented in this double album. The etymology of "haunt" relates to the concept of home – a place to inhabit or linger. It was a night to discern spirits: whom to welcome and whom to ward away. Lawrence not only wrote all the music and lyrics (except for the traditional Scottish words in "Bumps In The Night"), but she also performed all the vocals and played organ, harpsichord, celesta, bells and piano and contributed various sound effects.

Discography 
ALBUMS
 Arachnitect (2008)
 A Broom with a View (2009)
 Vampire Empire (2009)
 Edgar Allan Poe's "The Raven" (2012)
 Hallowe'en: Night of Spirits" (2018)

SINGLES
 Zombie Ambience (2015)
 Zombie Ambience ("Zombies Around Steve Bartek" Version) (2015)
 Zombie Ambience ("Quick Bite" Radio Edit) (2015)
 Gust ("Ghost Town" Version) (2015)
 Gust ("Crossroads" Version) (2015)
 Witch of the Salem Town (2019)
 Sleepy Hollow (Love is Scary) (2020)

GUEST PERFORMERS

Besides organ and keyboard skills, Kristen also shows the "rock" side and features special guest performers. She laid the rhythm on her first two singles with Jeff Friedl (Devo) on drums and Francesco DiCosmo (Thin Lizzy) on bass guitar at EastWest Studios. Looking at her wish list, Lawrence then utilized some fortuitous connections to be able to feature Steve Bartek (Oingo Boingo, Danny Elfman) on guitar, baritone guitar, and mandolin; John Avila (Oingo Boingo) on bass; Grammy Award winner MB Gordy (Doobie Brothers) on drums, as well as Monte Pitman (Madonna) for guitar and bass.

References

External links 
 Official Website: Kristen Lawrence Halloween Carols

1976 births
Living people
Latter Day Saints from California
Musicians from Orange County, California
American organists
American women composers
21st-century organists
21st-century American women